The 1966 NCAA University Division Outdoor Track and Field Championships were contested June 16−18 at the 44th annual NCAA-sanctioned track meet to determine the individual and team national champions of men's collegiate University Division outdoor track and field events in the United States. 

That year's outdoor meet was hosted by the Indiana University at Billy Hayes Track in Bloomington. 

UCLA easily topped the team standings, capturing their second national title.

Team result 
 Note: Top 10 only
 (H) = Hosts

References

NCAA Men's Outdoor Track and Field Championship
NCAA University Division Track and Field Championships
NCAA
NCAA University Division Track and Field Championships
Track and field in Indiana